Leonard Raymond Sipes (September 28, 1930 – March 14, 2000), better known as Tommy Collins, was an American country music singer and songwriter.

Active primarily during the 1950s through the 1970s, Collins was instrumental in helping create the Bakersfield sound of the country music genre. He enjoyed a string of hits during the mid-1950s including "It Tickles" and "Watcha Gonna Do Now". He also wrote several songs for other artists, including "If You Ain't Lovin' (You Ain't Livin')", which was a top 10 hit for Faron Young in 1954 and a No. 1 hit by George Strait in 1988.

After several years in the ministry, Collins returned to recording. In 1965, he had a comeback hit with "If You Can't Bite, Don't Growl". In the 1970s, he wrote several hits for Merle Haggard and The Strangers, including the No. 1 hits "Carolyn" and "The Roots of My Raising". In June 1980, Haggard recorded a biographical tribute to Collins called "Leonard".

Collins was the inspiration and character talked about in Craig Morgan's song, "I Wish I Could See Bakersfield".

Collins remained active in the songwriting business. He died March 14, 2000, at his home in Ashland City, Tennessee.

Discography

Albums

Singles

A"If You Can't Bite, Don't Growl" also peaked at number 5 on the Bubbling Under Hot 100 Singles chart.

References

External links
 [ Tommy Collins] at Allmusic.
 Tommy Collins at CMT.com

1930 births
2000 deaths
People from Bethany, Oklahoma
American country singer-songwriters
American male singer-songwriters
Country musicians from Oklahoma
Bakersfield sound
20th-century American singers
Singer-songwriters from Oklahoma
People from Ashland City, Tennessee
Country musicians from Tennessee
20th-century American male singers
Singer-songwriters from Tennessee